"Four Out of Five" is a song by English indie rock band Arctic Monkeys. It was released as the lead single from their sixth studio album, Tranquility Base Hotel & Casino (2018), on 13 May 2018, with an accompanying music video.

Composition and lyrics
Musically "Four Out of Five" has been described as glam rock, being compared to the works of David Bowie. The song is one of few on the album to feature a traditional chorus, and has been likened to the band's Suck It and See as well as Everything You've Come to Expect by Turner's side-project The Last Shadow Puppets. The track has also been compared to stylistic subversions by King Crimson, Jim O'Rourke and Billy Joel, "stomping with an eerie, psychedelic whimsy that seems to come naturally".

The song's absurdist lyrics describe a taqueria on the roof of the album's titular hotel that has been ironically receiving "rave reviews, four stars out of five". In an interview with Zane Lowe for Beats 1, Alex Turner explained the track's ironic jokes are about critics who "never give a perfect 100". Thematically the song alludes to a variety of topics including war, natural disasters, space colonisation, and gentrification. The song's narrator has been described as "the self-aggrandizing narcissist anticipating a big reaction, now tasked with filling up the silence", with the "mocking and self-aware" Turner's vocals "sung in a grizzly, demonic croon that's vaguely unstable, like he's either about to break into tears or hysterical laughter".

Music video
The music video was directed by Ben Chappell and Aaron Brown and was released on 13 May 2018 through the band's official YouTube account. The video features Alex Turner taking up the directorial chair and channeling several film influences, producing "video lifestyle packages" seemingly for the Tranquility Base Hotel & Casino. Among the packages being filmed, an alternative version of Turner without a beard is seen traversing tunnels, as well as the band playing at a country estate and assistants dressed in red overalls dressing the sets and taming a horse. Many of the scenes and shots were highly inspired by Stanley Kubrick movies. The video was filmed at Castle Howard in the band's native county of Yorkshire with the underground scenes being filmed at Munich Marienplatz station in Munich, Germany.

Critical reception
Sam Sodomsky of Pitchfork praised the track, referring to it as "in a peculiar spot as both Tranquility Base Hotel & Casino's most immediate song and one of its oddest". He described the track as one of the album's highlights, in which its "risks build to something extraordinary". He noted that the track was "an escape, an invitation to forget everything you know about this wildly popular band and take them on their own terms", comparing it positively to less successful "rock reinventions" by Arcade Fire and Jack White, with the track instead displaying "a striking, recharged imagination". He concludes that the track "makes the future – as bleak as it may be – seem a lot more fun".

Track listing

Personnel
Credits adapted from Tranquility Base Hotel & Casino liner notes.

Alex Turner – vocals, backing vocals, piano, bass, organ, guitar, acoustic guitar
Jamie Cook – guitar
Tom Rowley – electric guitar / solo
Matt Helders – drums
Loren Humphrey – drums 
James Righton – Wurlitzer
Josephine Stephenson – piano
James Ford – percussion, synthesiser, Orchestron, acoustic guitar, rotary timpani

Charts

Weekly charts

Year-end charts

Certifications

Release history

References

2018 songs
2018 singles
Arctic Monkeys songs
Domino Recording Company singles
Songs written by Alex Turner (musician)
Glam rock songs